Salvatore Caruso was the defending champion but lost in the second round to Jan Choinski.

Facundo Mena won the title after defeating Andrej Martin 2–6, 6–4, 6–1 in the final.

Seeds
All seeds receive a bye into the second round.

Draw

Finals

Top half

Section 1

Section 2

Bottom half

Section 3

Section 4

References

External links
Main draw
Qualifying draw

Città di Como Challenger - Singles
2019 Singles